The Odinist Community of Spain – Ásatrú, also known as European Odinist Circle, is a neo-völkisch organisation in Spain, founded in 1981, for followers of the form of modern Heathenry known as Odinism (after the chief deity of Germanic paganism, Odin). The community bases its ideology on the Visigothic, Suevian and Vandalian Germanic heritage of modern Spain, Portugal and Occitania. It was legally recognised as a religious institution by the Spanish government in 2007, and performed the first legal pagan wedding in mainland Spain since the Visigothic era, in Barcelona on 23 December 2007.  In Albacete in 2009, COE completed the first temple to Odin believed to have been built in over 1,000 years.  A less Odin-focused group split off in 2012 as the Ásatrú Lore Vanatrú Assembly (ALVA).

Odinism background

The term Odinism was coined by Orestes Brownson in his 1848 "Letter to Protestants". The term was re-introduced in the late 1930s by Alexander Rud Mills in Australia with his First Anglecyn Church of Odin and his book The Call of Our Ancient Nordic Religion. In the 1960s and early 1970s, Else Christensen's Odinist Study Group and later the Odinist Fellowship brought the term into usage in North America. Odinists do not necessarily focus on the worship of Odin, and most honour the full Germanic pantheon. Within Heathenry, the term Odinist or Wodenist is typically used by neo-völkisch groups, who are characterised by their pseudoscientific beliefs that legitimate observance of the religion is predicated on belonging to a specific biological race and that the ability to hold a relationship with the gods in encoded in their DNA.

Thus, Ásatrú is the 'Faith of the Æsir'). Vanatrú was coined after Ásatrú, implying a focus on the Vanir.

History
Under the influence of Christensen's group, Ernesto ("Ernust") García and Isabel Rubio founded the Spanish Odinist Circle in Spain in 1981. Christensen gave her blessing to this organisation, and recognized it in the year of its founding. It later broadened into the Odinist Community of Spain – Ásatrú (.  Since 2007, the organisation has also used the name "European Odinist Circle" (Círculo Odinista Europeo), after years of broader promotion of Odinism, and a shift back toward a focus on Odinism over Ásatrú and Vanatrú. The Europeo name is especially used by local congregations who are outside Spain or Spanish-speaking areas of Spain.
	 	
In 2006 the COE began a campaign against the destruction of an archaeological site in the ancient capital of the Visigoths, Toledo. Pressure was applied by COE, among others, on Jose Maria Barreda, who was then the local president of the autonomous community of Castile–La Mancha, and the site was preserved, containing the remains of a Visigothic settlement, which has since been declared a national monument.

COE went from being simply a cultural organisation to a religious institution officially recognized by the Spanish government, in 2007, under the name of Comunidad Odinista de España-Asatru, allowing them to perform "legally binding civil ceremonies" (weddings). COE has been the fourth Odinist and Asatruar religious organisation to have been recognized with official status in the world, after organisations in Iceland, Norway and Denmark.  While no such recognition is necessary in some countries, including the United States (where pagan weddings have been performed for many decades at least), in many jurisdictions, especially in predominantly Catholic countries or those with a state religion, this sort of official sanction can be very difficult to earn.

, European Odinist Circle has requested a declaration of Notorio arraigo from the Spanish government. If granted, this status of 'Deeply Rooted' would make Germanic paganism the first polytheistic religious denomination established in Spain which has equal legal standing with Christianity under the Advisory Commission on Religious Freedom (CALR) of the Spanish Ministry of Justice, ahead even of Hinduism in Spain.

In 2014, a census of COE's extended Odinist community totalled over 10,000 members with a presence throughout the whole country.

Structure
Below the Reiki, the Priestly Order Halirunae is composed of three types of roles: the goðar (singular goði 'priest' or gyðja 'priestess'); and two types of seiderkner (roughly, 'shamans'), the spaekona ('seer'), who performs spae magic (prophecy and divination), and the seidkona (roughly, 'sorcerer'), devoted to seid magic (clairvoyance and high magic) as well as leading the ceremonial functions. Any person, male or female, may fill any of these roles. However, a member of the seider must be considered by the congregation to demonstrably possess paranormal abilities or gifts; the goðar roles are more clerical and have no such requirement.

Alberto Paredes was elected president in 2009. In late 2011, co-founder Ernust García was elected as president again, after the resignation of Paredes.  García combines this role with that of the Allsherjargoði (basically 'chieftain', from the historical Icelandic warlord title), and the Ufargoði ('high priest') of the community.  Since 2007, the goðar have been governed by Goði Angel Arroyo, and since 2008 the order of seiderkner by Seidkona Maria Angeles Lozano.

Geographically, COE is organized in kindreds, local worship groups that, depending on the population density of their area, may range from citywide to regional.

Beliefs

The body of COE's doctrine is promulgated under the name Continental Odinist Rite.  In addition to naturally adopting the moral code of the Odinist religion, the Nine Noble Virtues, as part of its creed, COE has added its own set of nine Programmatic Points:

Odinism, our ancestral religion in Europe.
The religion of the future.
The Gods and the sacred.
A code of values as a vital livelihood.
Odinism as a lifestyle.
The world, man, soul and body.
Respect for diversity. Fight for identity.
Religion, politics, and society.
Everything perishes, everything returns to be.

The Odinist Community of Spain also studies the ideas of Rupert Sheldrake on the concept of morphic fields, and Carl Jung on collective unconscious, as "very close to the Germanic ideas surrounding ". The organisation also accepts the idea of metagenetics, proposed by the Stephen McNallen, the founder of the neo-völkisch hate group - the Asatru Folk Assembly. He defines this concept as "the hypothesis that there are spiritual or metaphysical implications to physical relatedness among humans which correlate with, but go beyond, the known limits of genetics". This idea of "biological kinship" has been noted to have been historically used to justify ethnocentrism, racism and classism, and is regarded as pseudoscience.

Similar to most other Odinist Heathen groups, the COE maintains that the observance of the religion is only legitimate for those of specific ancestry, however, unlike most Odinist groups that believe this ancestry to be that of Germanic-speaking Northern Europeans, the COE believes the religion to be exclusively for those of European descent. They espouse the view that the role of Odinism is to unite Europeans and that Odinists should strive to return to Thule, or Hyperborea, which they describe as being the origin, destination and spiritual centre of their religion. The group further believes that the "current ideological establishment" both hates and twists the Germanic heritage of Spain, preferring instead an "Afro-Semitic" version of history, which the COE describes as a "pseudo-historical story" that was made up for socio-cultural reasons and to fit the modern Spanish and European "guilt complex".

Holy days
The following holidays and events are official in the European Odinist Circle:
January (Snowmoon)
January 21: Anniversary of the founding of the Spanish Odinist Circle in 1981.
April (Grasamenoþs)
First full moon after the vernal equinox: Ostara festival. It represents the beginning of life after winter, when light and life come back into the souls of men.
May (Merrymoon)
May 1: Walpurgisnacht. Shamanic ceremony where Odin is represented by self-sacrifice at Yggdrasil.May 4: Remembrance day for Else Christensen. Mother of Odinism, who died May 4, 2005.
June (Sunnamenoþs)
June 21: Summer solstice. Festival to honor the god Balder.
September (Shedding)
2nd Saturday of September: Day of Odinism. National Meeting (Althing, from the ancient Icelandic parliament) of the whole congregation of COE, when a special blót (sacrifice and sacramental feast) to the gods and an Odinismic Confessional is conducted.
October (Wintrufulliþs)
October 16: Day of Vidarr, god of silence and revenge. Day of remembrance for martyrs.
November (Fruma Jiuleis)
November 1: Day of Heimfall (and corresponds with Celtic Samhain). Feast where death and life are separated by a line so thin, one may pass in both directions, through shamanic rituals.November 9: Feast of the Einherjar, heroes worthy to gather in Valhalla in the afterlife.
December (Afra Jiuleis)
December 21: Yule, a festival consisting of the 12 days after the winter solstice, and the most important event for Odinism. It represents the victory of the sun over the darkness, and is a time to make solemn oaths and take part in festivities for the god Freyr.

First marriage
On 23 December 2007, the first legal pagan wedding in mainland Spain in over 1,500 years took place on the beaches of Vilanova i la Geltrú, in the Barcelona province of Catalonia. A heterosexual couple in the Odinist Community of Spain (identified in the press only as "Jordi" and "Francesca" for privacy reasons) were wed under the Continental Odinist Rite, led by then-Goði (and co-founder) Ernust García of the COE.  The ceremony was attended by members of the COE as well as by modern pagans of all denominations in Spain, including the Ancient Religious Society of Kelt, the Wiccan Silver Willow Coven, and the Pagan Federation, as the historic occasion marked the first time in Spanish history that paganism of any kind had achieved legal recognition to conduct weddings, under the Spanish regulations of religious rites of minority religions in the country.

An earlier (non-European-based) modern pagan wedding took place in modern Spanish territory. It was held in 2002 in Tenerife, Canary Islands, and carried out by members of the modern pagan group Church of the Guanche People (named for the Guanches, ancient inhabitants of the Canary Islands before the conquest of the archipelago by Spain in the fifteenth century). This Canarian religious organisation is not officially recognized by Spanish authorities as such an institution, because it is linked to the independence movement in the islands. Nevertheless, the event was taken as a positive sign by religious minorities in the Canaries and Spain.

Temple

One of the pillar projects of the reformed OCE was to build a temple. In Navas de Jorquera, a town of Albacete in Castile-La Mancha, OCE legally acquired a ruin relating to early period of the settlement. It was completely rebuilt by OCE, beginning in mid-2005, constructed in the form of three traditional halls:
Hall devoted to the Aesir.
Hall devoted to the Vanir.
Shields hall, used for celebrations.

The building, the Templo de Gaut (from Gautr, one of the many names of Odin), was completed in 2009, consecrated, and has been in use since then. It is the only outdoor temple on a historic site in Spain that is legally in active use, since all others are included in the system of state monuments, and rituals cannot be performed in them.

A memorial stone for modern Odinism pioneer Else Christensen is housed in the temple.

Texts published
OCE published the first Spanish Odinist book in 2015, a confessional piece by Ernust García entitled Encuentro con Odin: Un Ensayo Sobre el Destino [Meeting with Odin: An Essay on Destiny].

See also
 Neopaganism in Latin Europe

References

External links
 Asatru.es, COE's official website (in Spanish)
 Odinism.net  (General Information on Odinism)

Germanic neopagan organisations
Modern pagan organisations based in Spain
Religious organizations established in 1981
1981 establishments in Spain
Modern pagan organizations established in the 1980s